Mauro Torres Homem Rodrigues (born 22 March 1932), better known as just Mauro, is a Brazilian former footballer who competed in the 1952 Summer Olympics.

References

1932 births
Living people
Association football defenders
Brazilian footballers
Olympic footballers of Brazil
Footballers at the 1952 Summer Olympics
Fluminense FC players